The Mairasi languages, also known as Etna Bay are a small independent family of Papuan languages in the classifications of Malcolm Ross and Timothy Usher, that had been part of Stephen Wurm's Trans–New Guinea proposal. They are named after Etna Bay, located in the southeastern corner of West Papua province, in Indonesia.

Languages
The Mairasi languages are clearly related to each other.

 Mairasi family: Semimi, Mer, Mairasi, Northeastern Mairasi

Classification
Mairasi cannot be linked to other families by its pronouns. However, Voorhoeve (1975) links it to the Sumeri (Tanah Merah) language, either a language isolate or an independent branch of the Trans–New Guinea family.

Pawley and Hammarström (2018) do not consider there to be sufficient evidence for the Mairasi languages to be classified as part of Trans-New Guinea, though they do note the following lexical resemblance between Mairasi, Semimi, and proto-Trans-New Guinea.

Mairasi ooro and Semimi okoranda ‘leg’ < proto-Trans-New Guinea *k(a,o)nd(a,o)C ‘leg’

Phonemes
Usher (2020) reconstructs the consonant inventory as follows:

{| 
| *m || *n ||  || 
|-
| *ɸ || *t || *s || *k
|-
| *mb || *nd || *ns || *ŋg 
|-
| *w || *ɾ || *j ||  
|}

Vowels are *a *e *i *o *u. *ns is uncommon.

Pronouns
Usher (2020) reconstructs the free and possessive pronouns as:
{| 
! !!sg!!pl
|-
!1excl
|rowspan=2|*omo, *o- ||*eme, *e-
|-
!1incl
|*e-tumakia, *e-
|-
!2
|*neme, *ne- ||*keme, *ke-
|-
!3
|*nani, *na- || ?
|}

Basic vocabulary
Some lexical reconstructions by Usher (2020) are:

{| class="wikitable sortable"
! gloss !! Proto-Etna Bay
|-
| hair/feather || *-suɾu
|-
| ear || *ɸiɾa
|-
| eye || *mbiatu
|-
| nose || *-mbi
|-
| tooth || *-ɾasi
|-
| tongue || *-saɸia
|-
| foot/leg || *-koɾa
|-
| blood || *iseɾe
|-
| bone || *tuɾa
|-
| skin/bark || *(na)-kia
|-
| breast || *joku
|-
| louse || *kumai
|-
| dog || *ansi
|-
| pig || *[ɸ]embe
|-
| bird || *sai
|-
| egg || *ete
|-
| man/male || *koɸo
|-
| woman || *eɸei
|-
| sun || *tende
|-
| moon || *aŋgane
|-
| water || *ɸat[e]
|-
| fire || *iɸoɾo
|-
| stone || *jaɸutu
|-
| path || *kae
|-
| name || *u[w]ata
|-
| one || *tana-(kau)
|-
| two || *amoi
|}

Cognates
Basic vocabulary of Mairasi languages (Mairasi, Mer, Semimi) with cognate matches, from Peckham (1991a,b), quoted in Foley (2018):

{| 
|+ Mairasi family basic vocabulary
! gloss !! Mairasi !! Mer !! Semimi
|-
| ‘bird’ || sai || sai || sai
|-
| ‘blood’ || isere || isere || monad
|-
| ‘bone’ || natura || singgu || natura
|-
| ‘breast’ || jogu || jogu || jogu
|-
| ‘ear’ || navir anda || nevira || ot navira
|-
| ‘eat’ || neneman || namba || neneme
|-
| ‘egg’ || eːte || ede || anggu ete
|-
| ‘eye’ || nambutu || nembiatu || ombiatu
|-
| ‘fire’ || ivore || ivoro || iforo
|-
| ‘give’ || tomnaijan || nombonaiyomo || tomonai
|-
| ‘ground’ || wasasai || wasase || makoro
|-
| ‘hair’ || nasuru || nasuru || nasuru
|-
| ‘hear’ || ivjeme || iveme || iveme
|-
| ‘I’ || ʔomo || omo || omo
|-
| ‘leg’ || naʔor || nakora || okor anda
|-
| ‘louse’ || ʔumai || kumai || kumai
|-
| ‘man’ || tatʔovo || neum tato || tatokovo
|-
| ‘moon’ || unsir || anggane || anggane
|-
| ‘name’ || nggwata || wata || newata
|-
| ‘one’ || tanggau || nawaze || tanakau
|-
| ‘path, road’ || ʔae || kae || kai
|-
| ‘see’ || natom || daviomo || nondome
|-
| ‘stone’ || javutu || wavo || javutu
|-
| ‘sun’ || tende || ungguru || tende
|-
| ‘tongue’ || nasavia || nesavi || osavi
|-
| ‘tooth’ || narasi || nerasi || orasi
|-
| ‘tree’ || ʔiu || u || ʔu
|-
| ‘two’ || amoi || amoi || amoi
|-
| ‘water’ || fata || kai || fate
|-
| ‘we’ || eːme || edumaga || ʔeme
|-
| ‘woman’ || evei || waini || efei
|-
| ‘you (sg)’ || ʔeme || kene || keme
|}

Usher's protoforms of the 20 most-stable items in the Swadesh list include the following.

{| class="wikitable sortable"
! Proto-Mairasi !! gloss
|-
| *kumai || louse 
|- 
| *amoi || two 
|- 
| *ɸat[e] || water 
|- 
| *-ɸiɾa || ear 
|- 
| ? || die 
|- 
| *o-mo|| I 
|- 
| ? || liver 
|- 
| *-mbiatu || eye 
|- 
| *-ɸaka || hand/arm
|- 
| *iɸi- || hear 
|- 
| ? || tree
|- 
| *uɾatu || fish 
|- 
| *u[w]ata || name 
|- 
| *jaɸutu || stone 
|- 
| *-ɾasi || tooth 
|- 
| *joku || breast 
|- 
| *ne-me || you 
|- 
| *kae || path 
|- 
| *-tuɾa || bone 
|- 
| *-saɸia || tongue
|}

Vocabulary comparison
The following basic vocabulary words are from Voorhoeve (1975), as cited in the Trans-New Guinea database:

{| class="wikitable sortable"
! gloss !! Mairasi !! Semimi
|-
! head
| neŋguvu || kotera
|-
! hair
| eŋguasa || nasuru
|-
! eye
| ne-mbutu || -mbiato
|-
! tooth
| nerasi || n-erasi
|-
! leg
| oʔoro || okoranda
|-
! louse
| umai || kumai
|-
! dog
| asi || ansi
|-
! pig
| bembe || pembe
|-
! bird
| sai || sai
|-
! egg
| ete || aŋgu-ate
|-
! blood
| isere || monda
|-
! bone
| natura || natura
|-
! skin
| n-aiʔa || kakia
|-
! tree
| iwo || u
|-
! man
| tatovo || tatakovo
|-
! sun
| tende || tende
|-
! water
| fata || fate
|-
! fire
| ivoro || iboro
|-
! stone
| javutu || jahutu
|-
! name
| negwata || nawata
|-
! eat
| nenem- || nenem-
|-
! one
| taŋggau || tana
|-
! two
| amoi || amoi
|}

See also

Papuan languages

Further reading
Peckham, Lloyd. 1982. Mairasi verb morphology. Workpapers in Indonesian Linguistics 1: 75–96.
Peckham, Lloyd. 1991. Etna Bay survey report: Irian Jaya Bird’s Neck languages. Workpapers in Indonesian Languages and Cultures 10: 147–185.
Peckham, Nancy, Adriana Waryengsi, Esther Fov and Mariana Oniw. 1991. Farir Mairas na’atuei = Perbendaharaan kata bahasa Mairasi = Mairasi vocabulary. SIL.

Notes

References

External links 
Mairasi languages database at TransNewGuinea.org
 Timothy Usher, New Guinea World, Proto–Etna Bay

 
New Guinea
Papuan languages
Language families